The 1951 SMU Mustangs football team represented Southern Methodist University (SMU) as a member of the Southwest Conference (SWC) during the 1951 college football season. Led by second-year head coach Rusty Russell, the Mustangs compiled an overall record of 3–6–1 with a mark of 1–4–1 in conference play, placing last out of seven teams in the SWC. SMU played home games at the Cotton Bowl in Dallas. Dick Hightower, Herschel Forester, Pat Knight were the team captains.

Schedule

References

SMU
SMU Mustangs football seasons
SMU Mustangs football